Great Plains Energy Incorporated was a holding company based in Kansas City, Missouri that owned electric utility Kansas City Power and Light Company and Strategic Energy, LLC, an energy management company.

KCP&L established the holding company on October 1, 2001.

Great Plains acquired Aquila, Inc. in July, 2008.

In 2014, it ranked #855 on the Fortune 1000 list.

Merger with Westar

In 2016, Great Plains and Westar Energy announced merger plans, but this proposed merger was rejected by Kansas Corporation Commission utility regulators as unfavorable to Kansas consumers. A new merger plan with Westar was announced in 2017. As of May 24, 2018, this merger has been approved by both the Missouri Public Service Commission and Kansas regulators, with the combined company to be named Evergy.

On October 7, 2019 the two operating companies officially changed names and rebranded to Evergy in the communities they serve.

References

International Directory of Company Histories, Vol. 65. St. James Press, 2004

External links

Official page
Finance yahoo profile

Companies formerly listed on the New York Stock Exchange
Electric power companies of the United States
Companies based in Kansas City, Missouri
Evergy
1882 establishments in Missouri
Holding companies of the United States
Energy in Missouri